The following radio stations broadcast on FM frequency 99.3 MHz:

Argentina
 Aguilares in Aguilares, Tucumán
 Alternativa in Villa de Merlo, San Luis
 Centro in Villa María, Córdoba
 Clasica in Jujuy
 del Este in Berazategui, Buenos Aires
 Impacto in Córdoba
 La dos in Corrientes
 Libertad in Charata, Chaco
 LRI712 Mitre Santa Fe in Santa Fe de la Vera Cruz, Santa Fe
 Kiss in Junin, Buenos Aires
 Futuro in Benito Juarez, Buenos Aires
 Integración in San Miguel, Buenos Aires
 La Nueve in 9 de Julio, Corrientes
 Municipal in Chilecito, La Rioja
 Oxígeno in Oberá, Misiones
 Panamericana in Huerta Grande, Córdoba
 Radio Maria in 25 de Mayo, Misiones
 RKM Radio Solidaria in Rosario, Santa Fe
 Senda antigua in La Plata, Buenos Aires
 Total in Paso de los Libres, Corrientes

Australia
 2KY in Gloucester, New South Wales
 2NSB in Sydney, New South Wales
 ABC Classic FM in Bega, New South Wales
 Bay FM 99.3 in Port Stephens, New South Wales
 2BXS in Bathurst, New South Wales
 Triple J in Bundaberg, Queensland
 7EDG in Hobart, Tasmania
 3NRG in Melbourne, Victoria
 3RPC in Portland, Victoria
 Triple J in Perth, Western Australia

Brazil
 ZYD 465 in Rio de Janeiro, Rio de Janeiro
 ZYD 435 in Maringá, Paraná
 ZYD 576 in Porto Alegre, Rio Grande do Sul

Canada (Channel 257)
 CBLA-FM-5 in Bancroft, Ontario
 CBPT-FM in Fort Nelson, British Columbia
 CBV-FM-6 in La Malbaie, Quebec
 CBXN-FM in Fort McMurray, Alberta
 CFAN-FM in Miramichi City, New Brunswick
 CFBA-FM in Foam Lake, Saskatchewan
 CFOR-FM in Maniwaki, Quebec
 CFOX-FM in Vancouver, British Columbia
 CFSF-FM in Sturgeon Falls, Ontario
 CHFM-FM-1 in Banff, Alberta
 CHGM-FM in Gaspe, Quebec
 CHSB-FM in Bedford, Nova Scotia
 CIQW-FM in Quinte West, Ontario (defunct)
 CIUP-FM in Edmonton, Alberta
 CJAN-FM in Asbestos, Quebec
 CJBC-4-FM in London, Ontario
 CJJM-FM in Espanola, Ontario
 CJPE-FM in Picton, Ontario (Prince Edward County)
 CJQC-FM in Liverpool, Nova Scotia
 CKDV-FM in Prince George, British Columbia
 CKGB-FM in Timmins, Ontario
 CKQN-FM in Baker Lake, Nunavut
 CKQR-FM in Castlegar, British Columbia
 CKUA-FM-2 in Lethbridge, Alberta

China
 CNR Business Radio in Baotou
 CNR China Traffic Radio in Shenyang
 Music FM Radio Guangdong in Guangdong

Indonesia
 Fajri FM Radio Bogor in Bogor, West Java

Guatemala (Channel 29)
TGAD in Flores

Malaysia
 Ai FM in Central Kelantan
 Raaga in Klang Valley

Mexico
 XHAFA-FM in Nanchital, Veracruz
 XHCCBJ-FM in Tepic, Nayarit
 XHCQR-FM in Cancún, Quintana Roo
 XHETU-FM in Tampico, Tamaulipas
 XHGW-FM in Ciudad Victoria, Tamaulipas
 XHHHI-FM in Hidalgo del Parral, Chihuahua
 XHJL-FM in Guamúchil, Sinaloa
 XHMRA-FM in Mérida, Yucatán
 XHMZQ-FM in Tepache, Sonora
 XHNK-FM in Nuevo Laredo, Tamaulipas
 XHNQ-FM in Acapulco, Guerrero
 XHOCL-FM in Tijuana, Baja California
 XHORA-FM in Orizaba, Veracruz
 XHOX-FM in Ciudad Obregón, Sonora
 XHPOP-FM in Mexico City
 XHQAA-FM in Chetumal, Quintana Roo
 XHRPC-FM in Chihuahua, Chihuahua
 XHSAC-FM in Saltillo, Coahuila
 XHSAJ-FM in Santa Catarina Juquila, Oaxaca
 XHSD-FM in Silao, Guanajuato
 XHTL-FM in San Luis Potosí, San Luis Potosí
 XHUE-FM in Tuxtla Gutiérrez, Chiapas
 XHZAZ-FM in Zacatecas, Zacatecas
 XHZIR-FM in Tingambato, Michoacán

Philippines
 DWTJ in Alaminos, Pangasinan

United States (Channel 257)
 KADA-FM in Ada, Oklahoma
 KAPW in White Oak, Texas
 KASR in Atkins, Arkansas
  in Gordonville, Missouri
 KCLI-FM in Cordell, Oklahoma
  in Boonville, Missouri
 KCMD in Grants Pass, Oregon
  in Elma, Washington
 KDER in Comstock, Texas
  in Moses Lake, Washington
 KDST in Dyersville, Iowa
 KEFH in Clarendon, Texas
 KEHM in Colorado City, Texas
 KEMP in Payson, Arizona
 KFOH-LP in Saint Joseph, Missouri
  in Grove, Oklahoma
 KGXG-LP in Victoria, Texas
 KGXY-LP in Muir Beach, California
 KHBX-LP in Hobbs, New Mexico
 KHDD-LP in Oklahoma City, Oklahoma
  in Overton, Nebraska
 KJOY in Stockton, California
 KJWL in Fresno, California
 KKBB in Bakersfield, California
  in Thief River Falls, Minnesota
 KKTS-FM in Douglas, Wyoming
 KLOR-FM in Ponca City, Oklahoma
  in Grass Valley, California
 KLZY-LP in Salina, Kansas
 KMAB-LP in Madras, Oregon
 KMGW in Naches, Washington
  in Red Lodge, Montana
  in Imperial, California
 KOKE-FM in Thorndale, Texas
 KPBA in Pine Bluff, Arkansas
  in Ruston, Louisiana
 KPSM in Brownwood, Texas
 KQEZ in St. Regis, Montana
 KQJO in St. Joseph, Louisiana
  in Indian Springs, Nevada
 KRWV-LP in Gold Canyon, Arizona
  in Saratoga, Wyoming
 KTPG in Paragould, Arkansas
  in Houston, Missouri
 KVDI in Huxley, Iowa
  in Saint Helena, California
 KWAY-FM in Waverly, Iowa
  in Roswell, New Mexico
 KWIC (FM) in Topeka, Kansas
 KWLZ in Shasta Lake City, California
 KWMN in Rushford, Minnesota
 KXRZ in Alexandria, Minnesota
 KYTM in Corrigan, Texas
 KZUC-LP in Edmond, Oklahoma
  in La Salle, Illinois
  in Alpena, Michigan
 WBET-FM in Sturgis, Michigan
  in Kennebunk, Maine
  in Chester, South Carolina
 WBTV-LP in Burlington, Vermont
 WBWH-LP in Bluffton, Ohio
  in Van Buren, Indiana
  in Cornelia, Georgia
 WDMP-FM in Dodgeville, Wisconsin
  in Havana, Illinois
  in Mexico Beach, Florida
 WEXX in Elizabethton, Tennessee
 WFDA-LP in Live Oak, Florida
  in Seneca Falls, New York
 WFQX (FM) in Front Royal, Virginia
  in Hanover, New Hampshire
 WGPD-LP in Winter Garden, Florida
 WHKF in Harrisburg, Pennsylvania
  in Franklin, Pennsylvania
  in Zeeland, Michigan
 WKCN in Lumpkin, Georgia
  in Medford, Wisconsin
  in Petersburg, Virginia
  in Farmington, Maine
  in Knox, Indiana
 WLAU in Heidelberg, Mississippi
 WLEZ in Lebanon Junction, Kentucky
  in Lowville, New York
 WLLS in Beulah, Michigan
  in Cocoa, Florida
 WLRZ-LP in Hickory, North Carolina
 WLZX-FM in Northampton, Massachusetts
 WMFC (FM) in Monroeville, Alabama
 WMNP in Block Island, Rhode Island
 WNRX in Jefferson City, Tennessee
  in Portsmouth, Ohio
  in Shawano, Wisconsin
 WOWZ-FM in Accomac, Virginia
 WPBX in Crossville, Tennessee
  in Uniontown, Pennsylvania
 WPMQ-LP in Charlestown, Indiana
  in Gatesville, North Carolina
 WRWB-FM in Ellenville, New York
  in Aurora, Indiana
  in Potsdam, New York
 WSRR-LP in Murfreesboro, Tennessee
  in Coshocton, Ohio
 WTPB-LP in Rockford, Illinois
 WTUP-FM in Guntown, Mississippi
 WVBX in Spotsylvania, Virginia
  in Scottsville, Kentucky
 WVLO in Cridersville, Ohio
 WWCN in Fort Myers Beach, Florida
 WWGY in Fulton, Kentucky
  in Kingstree, South Carolina
 WXFM-FM in Mount Zion, Illinois
  in Inglis, Florida
 WXRY-LP in Columbia, South Carolina
  in Nashville, North Carolina
  in Pleasantville, New Jersey
 WZLT in Lexington, Tennessee
 WZRE-LP in Perry, Florida
 WZRF-LP in Wilmington, North Carolina
  in South Williamsport, Pennsylvania

References 

Lists of radio stations by frequency